Sir William Morgan, KB (8 March 1700 – 24 April 1731) was a Welsh Whig politician of the early 18th century.

Morgan was the eldest son of Sir John Morgan, a Whig of great political influence in Brecknockshire and Monmouthshire. He inherited the Tredegar Estate from his father in 1720, and in 1722, entered the House of Commons, being returned for both Brecon and Monmouthshire and choosing to sit for the latter. He was also, like his father, appointed Lord Lieutenant of Brecknockshire and Lord Lieutenant and custos of Monmouthshire in 1720, and also became custos of Brecknockshire in 1723.

Morgan was one of the Founder Knights of the Order of the Bath upon its revival in 1725. Around 1724, he married Lady Rachel Cavendish (d. 1780), the daughter of William Cavendish, 2nd Duke of Devonshire. He was appointed Steward of the King's Lordship of Penkelly, and died at Tredegar in 1731. He left his Tredegar estate to his eldest son William. He was known for his courtesy and benevolence and his extravagant manner of living.

References

1700 births
1731 deaths
British MPs 1722–1727
British MPs 1727–1734
Knights Companion of the Order of the Bath
Lord-Lieutenants of Brecknockshire
Lord-Lieutenants of Monmouthshire
Members of the Parliament of Great Britain for Welsh constituencies
Whig (British political party) MPs for Welsh constituencies